Narayana Pillai was a social entrepreneur and businessman, who spent most of his life in Singapore during the colonial period. Of Tamil origins, he greatly contributed to the Tamil community in Singapore.

Prior to 1819, Pillai (also spelled Narayana Pillay) worked in Penang, which was ruled by the British. There, he came into contact with Stamford Raffles, a senior official of the British East India Company, who was keen to establish a new trading post at the southern end of the Straits of Malacca. This resulted in the founding of modern Singapore in 1819. In Penang, Raffles persuaded Pillai to join him and to work at his new settlement. The date of his death is unknown.

Early life

Arrival in Singapore 
Pillai arrived in Singapore with Raffles in 1819 on the ship.

Businesses 
With the establishment of a modern urban settlement in Singapore, Pillai noticed a boom in building works. He wrote to his contacts in Penang to send bricklayers, carpenters and cloth merchants to Singapore. He then established the island’s first brick kiln at what is now Tanjong Pagar. Through these efforts, he also became Singapore’s first building contractor.

Pillai also ventured into the cotton goods trade where he sold these at Cross Street. In time, his shop became the largest and best known in town. However, a fire in 1822 destroyed his business, leaving him in debt to British merchants who had let him large volumes of cloth on credit. Pillai struggled to negotiate with his creditors, and also secured help from Raffles when the latter returned to visit Singapore. At land he obtained in Commercial Square (now Raffles Place), he erected new warehouses and rebuilt his business from scratch, eventually paying off his debts and remaking his wealth.

Contributions 
Apart from his success in business, Pillai is best remembered for his social contributions. He was keen to build a temple on the island to serve the growing Hindu population there. After some difficulty in obtaining a suitable site, he was able to acquire land at South Bridge Road for the purpose in 1823. Here, he erected the Sri Mariamman Temple in 1827, which endures today as the oldest Hindu place of worship on the island, and one of the National Monuments of Singapore. Pillai also envisioned a Hindu Institute for young boys, but this did not materialize. Nevertheless, Pillai’s standing led to his appointment by the British as the chief of the Indian population, which conferred on him powers to settle disputes within the community.

Awards 
Pillay gained recognition as a leader amongst the Tamils and was appointed chief of Indians from Cholamandalaman, given the authority to settle disputes amongst the Tamils.

He was one of several local figures (like Sang Nila Utama) commemorated for the bicentennial establishing of modern Singapore in 2019 with their own statues erected in Raffles' Landing near the Singapore River. Pillai Road is named after him

See also 
 Tamils
 Hindu
 History of Singapore

Notes 

 ‘Pioneer Naraina Pillai should be honoured’ (1990, February 21).  The Straits Times, p. 14.
 ‘Singapore's first heroes’ (1983, November 6). The  Straits Times, p. 18.

References 

Singaporean people of Indian descent
19th-century Singaporean people
Singaporean Hindus
Malaysian businesspeople
Malaysian people of Indian descent
Tamil businesspeople
Businesspeople of Indian descent